Vasaparken is a park in Vasastaden, Gothenburg, Sweden.

The University of Gothenburg's main building is located on the northern part of the park.

Parks in Gothenburg